Otto Pendl (29 October 1951 – 10 November 2021) was an Austrian politician. A member of the Social Democratic Party of Austria, he served in the National Council from 1998 to 2017.

References

1951 births
2021 deaths
21st-century Austrian politicians
Social Democratic Party of Austria politicians
Members of the National Council (Austria)
People from Baden District, Austria